The Lauriston Building is an out-patient centre in Edinburgh, Scotland. It is managed by NHS Lothian.

History
The building, which was designed by Robert Matthew Johnson Marshall, formed part of the first phase of the intended re-development of the Royal Infirmary of Edinburgh and was built between 1976 and 1981. The Edinburgh Dental Institute moved to the building from Chambers Street in 1997. Since the Royal Infirmary of Edinburgh moved to Little France in 2001, the building has been used as a centre for outpatient services.

Services
It is used for outpatient services by ear, nose and throat, dermatology and orthopaedic departments.

Notes

References

External links
NHS Lothian

NHS Scotland hospitals
Teaching hospitals in Scotland
Hospitals in Edinburgh
NHS Lothian